The following is a list of recurring Saturday Night Live characters and sketches introduced between October 17, 1987, and February 27, 1988, the thirteenth season of SNL.

Pumping Up with Hans and Franz

Dana Carvey and Kevin Nealon play two Austrian jocks, inspired by Arnold Schwarzenegger. Debuted October 17, 1987.

Appearances

Dennis Miller
Dana Carvey impersonates the Weekend Update anchor beside him.

Appearances

Tonto, Tarzan and Frankenstein's Monster
This trio showcased three popular film characters who were probably least likely to get together and sing because they are all known for their inability to speak proper English. Tonto (played by Jon Lovitz) and Tarzan (played by Kevin Nealon) mostly spoke the lyrics in broken English, leaving out certain verbs and pronouns, while Frankenstein's Monster (played by Phil Hartman) usually just growled and moaned, rarely forming any semblance of the actual words, though he could opine that "bread good" and "fire bad". They came together to sing "We Are the World", and during the holidays they would usually sing Christmas carols. On one occasion, they recited Edgar Allan Poe's classic poem "The Raven". For Easter, the trio were joined by Frankenstein's Monster's evil twin (Mel Gibson), who spoke whole sentences; they sang "Here Comes Peter Cottontail". All four, plus Tarzan's own Jane, starred in their own sporadic soap opera, "As World Turn" (taken from the long-running As the World Turns). Debuted December 19, 1987 and appeared in the early 1990s.

Appearances

Appearances
Tarzan: 
November 19, 1988
Frankenstein's Monster: 
January 19, 1991
April 17, 1993
March 23, 1996

Learning To Feel
A Nora Dunn sketch. Debuted January 23, 1988.

Appearances

Girl Watchers
A Tom Hanks and Jon Lovitz sketch. Two men comment to each other as they leer at passing women. Their cocksure tone of voice never changes, even as they acknowledge that no woman would ever find them attractive. Debuted February 20, 1988.

Appearances

References

Lists of recurring Saturday Night Live characters and sketches
Saturday Night Live
Saturday Night Live
Saturday Night Live in the 1980s